Orania nodosa is a species of sea snail, a marine gastropod mollusk in the family Muricidae, the murex snails or rock snails.

Description
The length of the shell attains 18.4 mm.

Distribution
This marine species occurs off the Solomon Islands.

References

 Hombron, J. B. & Jacquinot, H., 1848 -Atlas d’Histoire Naturelle Zoologie par MM. Hombron et Jacquinot, chirurgiens de l’expédition, in Voyage au pole sud et dans l’Océanie sur les corvettes l’Astrolabe et la Zélée exécuté par ordre du roi pendant les années 1837-1838-1839-1840 sous le commandement de M. Dumont-D’Urville capitaine de vaisseau publié sous les auspices du département de la marine et sous la direction supérieure de M. Jacquinot, capitaine de Vaisseau, commandant de la Zélée. 25ème Livraison, p. pls 14, 16, 19, 22
In: Voyage au Pôle Sud et dans l'Océanie sur les corvettes l'Astrolabe et la Zélée, Zoologie, vol. 5, p. 1-118, 125-131 (Mollusques); 119-124, 131-132 (Zoophytes)
 Raven J.G.M. (2016). Notes on molluscs from NW Borneo. 3. A revision of Taurasia (Gastropoda, Muricidae) and Preangeria (Gastropoda, Buccinidae) with comments on Semiricinula from NW Borneo. Vita Malacologica. 15: 77-104.

External links
 MNHN. Paris: syntype

Gastropods described in 1841
Orania (gastropod)